Cousinea is a genus of spiders in the family Oonopidae. It was first described in 2001 by Saaristo. , it contains only one species, Cousinea keeleyi, found in the Seychelles.

References

Oonopidae
Monotypic Araneomorphae genera
Spiders of Africa